Nea Ekklisoula ( meaning "new church") is a village in the municipality of Megalopoli, Arcadia, Greece. It is situated near the southwestern foothills of the Mainalo mountains, at about 450 m elevation. It is 2 km southwest of Trilofo, 2 km east of Soulos and 4 km north of Megalopoli town centre.  Nea Ekklisoula had a population of 39 in 2011.

Population

See also
List of settlements in Arcadia

References

External links
History and information about Nea Ekklisoula
 Nea Ekklisoula on GTP Travel Pages

Megalopolis, Greece
Populated places in Arcadia, Peloponnese